Marius Iulian Cocioran (born 10 July 1983, in Reșița) is a Romanian race walker. He competed in the 50 kilometres walk event at the 2012 Summer Olympics.

Competition record

References

1983 births
Living people
Sportspeople from Reșița
Romanian male racewalkers
Olympic athletes of Romania
Athletes (track and field) at the 2012 Summer Olympics
Athletes (track and field) at the 2016 Summer Olympics
World Athletics Championships athletes for Romania
Athletes (track and field) at the 2020 Summer Olympics